Randy McDaniel (born August 8, 1967) is an American politician who served as the Oklahoma State Treasurer from 2019 to 2023. A Republican, he was a member of the Oklahoma House of Representatives, for the 83rd district, from 2007 through 2019.

Career
McDaniel graduated from Edmond Memorial High School in Edmond, Oklahoma, in 1986. He graduated from the University of Oklahoma with a bachelor's degree in economics and from the University of Cambridge with a master's degree in land economy. He worked in banking and as a financial advisor. In 2006, McDaniel was elected to the Oklahoma House of Representatives for the 83rd district. He served in the Oklahoma House for six terms. In the 2018 elections, McDaniel ran for Oklahoma State Treasurer. He won the election over Democrat Charles de Coune.

Ken Miller resigned as Treasurer effective January 1, 2019, and Mary Fallin appointed McDaniel, swearing him in that day. McDaniel announced that he would not run for reelection in 2022.

References

External links

1967 births
Alumni of the University of Cambridge
Living people
Republican Party members of the Oklahoma House of Representatives
People from Edmond, Oklahoma
State treasurers of Oklahoma
University of Oklahoma alumni
Edmond Memorial High School alumni